The 52nd ceremony of the Golden Globe Awards, honoring the best in film and television for 1994, was held on January 21, 1995, at the Beverly Hilton Hotel in Beverly Hills, California. The nominations were announced on December 21, 1994.

Winners and nominees

Film 

The following films received multiple nominations:

The following films received multiple wins:

Television 
The following programs received multiple nominations:

The following programs received multiple wins:

Ceremony

Presenters 

 Robert Altman
 Rosanna Arquette
 Victor Borge
 Barry Bostwick
 Beau Bridges
 Margaret Cho
 Joan Collins
 Bruce Davison
 Richard Dreyfuss
 Valeria Golino
 Louis Gossett, Jr.
 Marilu Henner
 Charlton Heston
 Lauren Holly
 Sally Kellerman
 Joey Lawrence
 Michele Lee
 Dudley Moore
 Gregory Peck
 Rosie Perez
 Lou Diamond Phillips
 Aidan Quinn
 Anthony Quinn
 Emma Samms
 Arnold Schwarzenegger
 William Shatner
 Cybill Shepherd
 Terence Stamp
 Sharon Stone
 Patrick Swayze
 Jonathan Taylor Thomas
 Jennifer Tilly
 Rip Torn
 Jean-Claude Van Damme
 Sela Ward
 Mykelti Williamson
 Mara Wilson
 Alfre Woodard

Cecil B. DeMille Award
The Cecil B. DeMille Award is an honorary Golden Globe Award bestowed for "outstanding contributions to the world of entertainment".
 Sophia Loren

"In Memoriam" segment 

Burt Lancaster
Raul Julia
Harriet Nelson
John Candy
Cesar Romero
Martha Raye
Barry Sullivan
George Peppard
Joseph Cotten
Dinah Shore
Cab Calloway
Telly Savalas
Macdonald Carey
Mildred Natwick
Henry Mancini
Claude Akins
Cameron Mitchell
William Conrad
Melina Mercouri
Jessica Tandy

Awards breakdown 
The following networks received multiple nominations:

The following networks received multiple wins:

See also
 67th Academy Awards
 15th Golden Raspberry Awards
 1st Screen Actors Guild Awards
 46th Primetime Emmy Awards
 47th Primetime Emmy Awards
 48th British Academy Film Awards
 49th Tony Awards
 1994 in film
 1994 in American television

References

052
1994 film awards
1994 television awards
January 1995 events in the United States
Golden